Bail Enforcers (later released as Bounty Hunters) is a 2011 film starring Trish Stratus, Christian Bako and Boomer Phillips directed by Patrick McBrearty. It marks the acting debut of former WWE wrestler Trish Stratus in a feature-length film.

Synopsis
A group of people which specializes in catching people who have skipped bail or have a bounty on their heads. One night the group, consisting of Jules (Trish Stratus), Chase (Boomer Phillips), and Ridley (Frank J. Zupancic), catches an informant with a $100,000 bounty on his head. A mobster who wants this man for his own purposes offers the group a million dollars to turn the informant over to him.

Cast

Awards

Boomer Phillips who played Chase Thomson was nominated for a Canadian Comedy Award for Best Male Performance.

References

External links
 
 

2011 films
Canadian crime drama films
English-language Canadian films
2010s English-language films
2010s Canadian films